The National Fonts are sets of freely-licensed computer fonts for the Thai script sponsored by the Thai government. The original National Fonts include three Thai typefaces released by NECTEC in 2001, while a follow-up program, more specifically known as the fourteen National Fonts, or colloquially SIPA fonts, include fourteen typefaces distributed and used by the Government of Thailand as public and official fonts after they won a national competition held in 2007. The fonts and all of their subsequently developed versions are released by the Software Industry Promotion Agency (Public Organisation), or SIPA, together with the Department of Intellectual Property through f0nt.com, and can be downloaded freely on the website.

History 
The competition was organised by Abhisit Vejjajiva's Council of Ministers, with a view to replacing all existing fonts the Thai Government had bought from the private sector, including Microsoft's Angsana New, Browalia New, Cordia New, and EucrosiaUPC, which were extensively used at that time, with fonts created by Thai nationals. The competition was part of the "Standard Fonts for Thai Public Sectors" Project (โครงการฟอนต์มาตรฐานราชการไทย) proposed by the Ministry of Information and Communication Technology. The Ministry was quoted as saying: "...Various fonts are now used among the public agencies, that's why the state papers have never become standard. The fonts are also from the private companies which monopolise the rights over them, so we cannot use them as much as we should...".

On 7 September 2010, the Council of Ministers officially announced the thirteen fonts as the public fonts, naming them the "national fonts". The public agencies were ordered to use these fonts, especially TH Sarabun PSK, in their state papers. They were required to cease to use the private sector's fonts by 5 December 2010, King Bhumibol Adulyadej's 83rd birthday. The legislative branch and the judicial branch were also asked for cooperation.

The font "TH Sarabun PSK" has been used in the Government Gazette of Thailand since January 2011, replacing Angsana New. The Gazette's first volume using such font is volume 128, part 1 A, dated 7 January 2011, in which the "Ministerial Regulation Determining the Criteria and Procedure for Acknowledging the Aircraft Type Certificates or Supplementary Type Certificates issues by the State Parties to the Conventions governing the Application for Certificates of Airworthiness or by the States with which Thailand has adopted the similar Agreements, BE 2553 (2010)" ("กฎกระทรวงกำหนดหลักเกณฑ์และวิธีการรับรองใบรับรองแบบอากาศยานหรือใบรับรองแบบส่วนเพิ่มเติมที่ออกโดยรัฐภาคีแห่งอนุสัญญาหรือประเทศที่ได้ทำความตกลงกับประเทศไทย เพื่อขอใบสำคัญสมควรเดินอากาศ พ.ศ. 2553") was published.

In 2018, Google Fonts and a local font foundry Cadson Demak revised all Thai National fonts and released them under Open Font License.

On 6 July 2021, the Council of Ministers officially approved the royal font set "Chulabhorn Likhit", the 14th Thai government standard font set as proposed by the Chulabhorn Royal Academy. The font is named to celebrate Princess Chulabhorn on the occasion of her 64th birthday and her graduation from the Doctor of Philosophy program in the Visual Arts Department, Faculty of Painting, Sculpture and Graphic Arts at Silpakorn University.

The font "TH Sarabun PSK" is also used on the current logo of Thai Wikipedia. This version of the logo was designed by Pratya Singto (ปรัชญา สิงห์โต), a graphic designer who runs f0nt.com, and was adopted by the Community as it won a competition in 2008.

The fourteen fonts are:

Google Fonts 

In 2018, Cadson Demak, a local font foundry work with Google Fonts to revised all the National fonts, providing them with more hintings, wider range of weights, and better Unicode supports. There is also a new font "Thasadith" which was inspired from TH Srisakdi.

References

External links
 SIPA fonts - f0nt.com
 "TH Sarabun New" - f0nt.com
 Suppakit Chalermlarp's idea in designing "TH Sarabun PSK" - Department of Intellectual Property
 Thai National fonts and other Thai fonts on Google Fonts

Government typefaces
Thai typefaces